Peter J. Cutino (April 3, 1933 – September 19, 2004) was an American swimming and water polo coach and educator for over 40 years and the author of several books and numerous articles on coaching aquatic sports. In his 26 years as head coach at the University of California, Berkeley, his Cal teams won eight NCAA titles.  He was the all-time winning coach in U.S. water polo history.  His efforts for water sports training, development of facilities for competition and philanthropic support of athletes earned him national recognition.  In 1999, the Peter J. Cutino Award was established in his honor by the San Francisco Olympic Club, and is presented annually to the top American male and female collegiate water polo players.

Coaching
Cutino attended college at Cal Poly San Luis Obispo and received a master's degree in education in 1959. At Cal Poly, he made the varsity water polo and swimming teams, was selected three-time water polo all-conference and held multiple school records. From 1958 to 1963, Cutino was head water polo and swimming coach at Oxnard High School, where his swim teams compiled a 64–8 record and five county championships and several Southern California championships, while his water polo team went 80–12. 

In 1961, his team played El Segundo High School coached by 1964 Olympic coach Uri Saari. The El Segundo team had several Olympians-to-be on its team. But Pete had home pool and the refs. Home pool had a shallow end, and both the goalie and O hole defender of Oxnard skillfully used the bottom. In a classic momentum shifting tug of war, Oxnard won.

In 1963 Cutino became head coach of both the UC Berkeley men's water polo and swimming programs. In 1974 Hall of Fame coach Nort Thornton took over the swim program, leading Cal swimmers to two national championships. 

Cutino directed Golden Bear water polo teams to eight national championships and a 519-172-10 career record during his 25-year tenure. His last team in 1988 won a school-record 33 games on the way to a second straight NCAA title. Cutino coached 68 All-Americans, six Pac-10 and NCAA Players of the Year, and five Olympians. 

The Cutino presence at Cal water polo matches was both showmanship and strategy. Known for his passion, he would pace the edge of the pool, shouting and a congratulating, and constantly working the officials. His athletes learned quickly about his training system. "He taught us that anything worth accomplishing would not come without discomfort," recalls Kirk Everist, who played for Cutino at Cal and is now the head coach there. "And he was always there to administer the discomfort."

Cutino served as head coach of the US National Team (1972–76), the US Olympic Team (1976), and the US team at the World University Games in Yugoslavia (1987). He was elected to the FINA Technical Water Polo Committee, the international governing body of the sport, as well as  leadership roles in the NCAA and USA Water Polo.

After retiring as Cal head coach in 1989, Cutino continued to conduct clinics and coached Olympic Club teams. He participated at the 2000 Olympics in Sydney, Australia, as a water polo official and served as chairman of the Men’s International Olympic Committee. His special interest was advocating for construction of pools suitable for water polo and swimming training and competition. To recognize his role promoting and raising funds for Cal Aquatics, the Peter J. Cutino Scholarship Fund was established in 2003 to provide financial support to qualified UC Berkeley athletes.

Awards and honors

Won by Peter Cutino

College Swim Coaches Association Master Coach Award, considered the most distinguished accolade in aquatics.
Four-time NCAA and Pac-10 Coach of the Year.
UC Berkeley Alumni Centennial Award and Chancellors Commendation.
AIA Gold Pin award from the Association International des Arbitres
Silver Pin Award from FINA
Cal Poly Athletics Hall of Fame, 1989.
US Water Polo Award, highest honor in the sport
University of California Athletic Hall of Fame, 1994
USA Water Polo Hall of Fame, 1995
Italian Hall of Fame 2002
US Congressional Award, as an educator and a coach
Olympic Club Hall of Fame 2007
Monterey Peninsula Hall Of Fame 1999

Named for Peter Cutino

Peter J Cutino Award (presented annually to outstanding collegiate male and female water polo player)
Cutino Cup Channel Islands Award (high school league swim champion)
Peter Cutino Award (given annually to the Athlete of the Year at Monterey Peninsula College)

Quotes
"Imagine for a moment that you are an athlete on a team that I coach. This is what I would say to you: youth only comes once in a lifetime. The opportunity to compete in sport is short lived, and to compete at this level is truly extraordinary. So it is important to pause for and reflect on the values and principles inherent in what you do. These principles can, depending on you, guide your future."
"Make your luck."
"To compete in sports is to eliminate the comfort zone."
"The opportunity to compete in sports is short-lived, and to compete at this level is truly extraordinary.  So it is important to pause and reflect on the values and principles inherent in what you do.  These principles can, depending on you, guide your future."
"If you are a champion, you become the standard, the target, and that is as it should be - in order for you to constantly develop towards excellence."
"Do not trade long-term values like character and dignity for temporary bravado and the in-your-face mentality."
"Do sports build character? I contend they reveal it."
"You pay a price to get there, you pay a price to stay there."

Personal
Pete Cutino grew up in and around Monterey Bay, the second of four children in Sicilian fishing family of Paul and Rose Cutino. Young Pete wanted to become a fisherman like his father, and worked on board the boat frequently as a boy. He later said many of the coaching techniques he used were learned working with his father's crew. "They had ways of just motivating you on the boat.  Everything was competition," he said. "It was a macho thing...but it was exciting as hell." He recalled that when he was in his 40s, he came home to find his father needed another hand on the boat. "I said, I went to the greatest university in the world, they call me professor, I'm going to take my vacation." There was silence. Then his father said, You gonna go fishing or you gonna be a bum?"

Monterey was home. He starred on the swim team at Monterey High School, where his wife, Louise, was a cheerleader. Leon Panetta, the former congressman and White House chief of staff, grew up, like Cutino, in the section of Monterey between Calle Principal and the Presidio, the neighborhood Cutino wrote about in his memoir Monterey: A View from Garlic Hill, a book on the local Italian-American community. In 1989 when he stepped down as UC Berkeley's head water polo coach, he returned to run the Monterey Sports Club, promoting athletics in the local community. When Pete Cutino died in 2004 at age 71, some 1200 of his former players —along with friends, family, local and national sports and community leaders — attended his memorial service.

His son, Peter J. Cutino Jr. was a two-time All-American at UC Berkeley, and helped lead the Bears to the NCAA National Championship. He was also named Pac-10 Conference Player of the Year, 1983 NCAA Collegiate Co-Player of the Year, and Co-MVP of the NCAA Tournament. Peter Cutino Jr. is the president of the Seville Water Polo Foundation.

His brother, Bert Cutino, is a successful local restaurateur, distinguished executive chef of the American Academy of Chefs and co-sponsors a national hospitality scholarship program.

References

External links
 
 CBS Sportline: Cal remembers Cutino's legacy.
 Friends of Cal Aquatics tribute
 Berkeleyan: Pete Cutino obituary
 Sacramento Bee: Cutino recalls stories about fishing with his father
 Water Polo Articles by Pete Cutino

1933 births
2004 deaths
American water polo coaches
American water polo officials
California Golden Bears men's water polo coaches
California Golden Bears swimming coaches
Cal Poly Mustangs men's water polo players
Sportspeople from Monterey, California